Deividas Kizala (born 12 February 1998) is a Lithuanian ice dancer. With his skating partner, Paulina Ramanauskaitė, he competed at the 2022 Winter Olympics.

Career

Early years 
As a single skater, Kizala was coached by Loreta Vitkauskienė and competed at two ISU Junior Grand Prix events in 2011.

By 2014, he had teamed up with Guostė Damulevičiūtė to compete in ice dancing. The two debuted their partnership at the Volvo Open Cup in November 2014. They would represent Lithuania at three ISU Junior Grand Prix (JGP) events and three consecutive World Junior Championships, from 2015 to 2017. They qualified to the free dance at the 2017 World Junior Championships and finished 17th overall. They also made several appearances in the senior ranks, most notably at the 2018 European Championships. They ended their partnership after four seasons together.

In the 2018–19 season, Kizala skated with American ice dancer Mira Polishook, representing Lithuania in the junior ranks. The duo competed at two JGP events and qualified to the final segment at the 2019 World Junior Championships, where they finished 19th. They parted ways after one season as a team.

Partnership with Ramanauskaitė 
In 2020, Kizala teamed up with Paulina Ramanauskaitė to compete as seniors. The two made their international debut in December 2020, at the Winter Star in Minsk, Belarus.

Although Allison Reed / Saulius Ambrulevičius qualified a spot for Lithuania in ice dancing at the 2022 Winter Olympics, Reed's application for Lithuanian citizenship was unsuccessful. Following this decision, Ramanauskaitė/Kizala were nominated to fill the spot and placed 23rd at the Olympics.

Programs

With Ramanauskaitė

With Polishook

With Damulevičiūtė

Men's singles

Competitive highlights 
CS: Challenger Series; JGP: Junior Grand Prix

Ice dance with Ramanauskaitė

Ice dance with Polishook

Ice dance with Damulevičiūtė

Men's singles

References

External links 

 
 
 

Lithuanian male ice dancers
1998 births
Living people
Sportspeople from Kaunas
Figure skaters at the 2016 Winter Youth Olympics
Olympic figure skaters of Lithuania
Figure skaters at the 2022 Winter Olympics
Competitors at the 2023 Winter World University Games